Chymotrypsin C, also known as  caldecrin or elastase 4, is an enzyme that in humans is encoded by the CTRC gene.

Function 

Chymotrypsin C is a member of the peptidase S1 family. The encoded protein is a serum calcium-decreasing factor that has chymotrypsin-like protease activity.

References

Further reading